"Axel F" is an electronic instrumental by German musician Harold Faltermeyer. It served as the theme for the 1984 film Beverly Hills Cop, starring Eddie Murphy, and became an international number one hit in 1985. The track reached number one in Ireland as well as on the US Billboard Hot Dance Club Play chart. Additionally, it was a number two hit in Belgium, Canada, the Netherlands, Switzerland, the UK and West Germany.

Background
The title comes from the main character's name in the film, Axel Foley (played by Eddie Murphy). It is composed in the key of F minor.

Faltermeyer recorded the song using five instruments: a  Roland Jupiter-8 provided the distinctive "supersaw" lead, a Moog modular synthesizer 15 provided the bass, a Roland JX-3P provided chord stab brasses, a Yamaha DX7 was used for the marimba sound, and a LinnDrum was used for drum programming.

According to Faltermeyer, the initial reaction to his premiere presentation of the cues to the film's producers and director did not result in an immediate approval; it was not until director Martin Brest voiced his approval that the producers showed enthusiasm.

In addition to the Beverly Hills Cop soundtrack, the song also appears on Faltermeyer's 1988 album Harold F. as a bonus track. Reportedly, Faltermeyer was against including it, but MCA insisted as it was his most recognizable track.

Music video
An unusual music video was produced to promote the single, directed by Faltermeyer. He is featured dressing in an overcoat, hat, and sunglasses. He sneaks into a computer room in the night and watches as he plays the synthesizer while playing some scenes from the film.

Personnel
Harold Faltermeyer – synthesizers, drum programming

Track listings
 7" single
 "Axel F" – 3:00
 "Shoot Out" – 2:44

 12" maxi
 "Axel F" (M & M Mix) – 7:00
 "Axel F" (Extended Version) – 7:09
 "Shoot Out" – 2:44

 12" maxi
 "Axel F" (Extended Version) – 7:09
 "Shoot Out" – 2:44

Charts
This version of the song reached number 2 on the UK Singles Chart and number 3 on the Billboard Hot 100 in the US. It also spent two weeks atop the American adult contemporary chart.

Weekly charts

Year-end charts

Certifications and sales

Techno Cop version

In 1992, German techno group Techno Cop covered the instrumental, whose success modestly ranked to a top 30 success. Compared to the original, this version contains rap passages.

Track listing
 12" maxi
 Axel F (Outlaw Mix) - 5:50
 Axel F (Megaphone Mix) - 5:20
 Cops In Trance - 4:15	

 CD maxi
 Axel F (U-Boot Mix) - 6:00
 Axel F (Radio Edit) - 3:49
 Axel F (Minimalistixtendid) - 4:41
 Beverly Kills - 2:58

Charts

Clock version

British pop/dance act Clock released a successful dance cover of "Axel F" in 1995. Produced by Richard Pritchard and Stu Allan, it was featured on their debut album, It's Time... (1995), and peaked at number five in Scotland, number seven in the UK, number eight in Ireland and number 37 in Sweden. On the Eurochart Hot 100, the single reached number 20 in March 1995, while in Australia, it peaked at number 42.

Critical reception
James Masterton wrote in his weekly UK chart commentary, "There is no denying the brilliance of this record, making the Harold Faltermeyer classic more of a dance hit than he could ever have dreamed as the song makes the Top 10 close on ten years since the original did the same." Alan Jones from Music Weeks RM Dance Update described the song as "another energetic remake". Another editor, James Hamilton, declared it as an "ultra excitingly galloping 135bpm Hi-NRG" track.

Track listing
 UK CD maxi"Axel F (Radio Short Stab)" - 3:22 
"Axel F (Primax Mix)" - 4:47 
"Keep Pushin' (Clock N-R-G Mix)" - 6:27 
"Keep Pushin' (PTP 'London' Mix)" - 7:46

 Sweden CD maxi"Axel F (Radio Edit)" - 3:38 
"Axel F (Primax Mix)" - 4:44 
"Axel F (Ten to Two Mix)" - 5:40 
"Keep Pushing (PTP London Edit)" - 4:40 
"Clock Megamix" - 15:40

Charts

PSY version

In 2002, Psy released a title track "Champion" as part of his album 3 Mai with its "crowd-pumping vibe", during Seoul's enthusiasm over the 2002 FIFA World Cup. The title song "Champion" was also inspired by Korean street cheering during the 2002 World Cup. 

Paul Lester of The Guardian called "Champion" a "thrashy disco" which heavily samples Axel F by Harold Faltermeyer".

Jeff Benjamin of Billboard said, "'Champion' is a funky dance track that uses video game-like synthesizers years before the EDM explosion. With self-empowering lyrics and the repeated title word in the chorus, the song doubled as an anthem for South Korea when they hosted the World Cup in Seoul that year."

Crazy Frog version

In 2005, Crazy Frog recorded the song, releasing it as "Axel F'''", and it became a summer hit that year. The novelty song is Crazy Frog's first and most internationally successful single. The cover was produced by Matthias Wagner and Andreas Dohmeyer, the two members of Off-cast Project, and Henning Reith and Reinhard "DJ Voodoo" Raith, two members of the German dance production team Bass Bumpers. Wolfgang Boss and Jamster! arranged the remix, and later marketed it as a ringtone.

The song consists of vocals taken from the Crazy Frog recording by Daniel Malmedahl in 1997. It uses mainly the same part of the two-minute original that was used in Jamster's ringtone release. The song also uses the "What's going on?" vocal samples (as well as the instruments) from another 2003 cover of Axel F, by Murphy Brown and Captain Hollywood (dubbed "Axel F 2003" and sometimes "Axel F 2004" also produced by Matthias Wagner and Andreas Dohmeyer). The "ring ting ting" vocal is sampled from "Yo Soy Cubano" by the band "The Chakachas".

The Ministry of Sound hired Kaktus Film and Erik Wernquist of TurboForce3D, the original creator of the 3D Crazy Frog, to produce a full-length animated music video to accompany the release of the song. The video, featuring the Crazy Frog character, is set in the future, and centres on his pursuit by a bounty hunter. The bounty hunter receives notification of a $50,000 reward for capturing the frog.

There were three edits to the song. The original version of the song can be found at most P2P networks. This song used the "What's going on?" samples twice throughout the song and the "weeee!" sound is heard before the motorbike section of the song. A radio edit was made which had the frog saying "This is the Crazy Frog!" and removed some sounds, and a third edit was made for the Crazy Hits album with the frog saying "I am the Crazy Frog!"

Chart performances
Released across Europe in May 2005, "Axel F" topped the charts in the United Kingdom, with some of the best weekly sales of the year (out-selling rivals such as Coldplay by four copies to one), and remained at top of the UK Singles Chart for four weeks and becoming Britain's third best-selling single of 2005, outselling and outpeaking the original version. 
In other European countries the popularity has differed, with the song failing to make the top 20 in Switzerland at first, before gradually climbing to number 1, whilst only making number 18 in Russia. It also reached number 1 in the overall European chart, after initially being number 2 to Akon's "Lonely" for several weeks, and stayed there until September. It also reached number 1 in Australia, Republic of Ireland, Belgium, Denmark, France, New Zealand, Norway, Ukraine, Spain, and Sweden.

In France, the song made an amazing jump, entering the French Singles Chart at number seventy seven on June 11, 2005, and moving all the way to number two the next week. There it stayed for two weeks before climbing to the summit, where it remained for thirteen weeks. It fell off the first position being dethroned by its 2nd single, "Popcorn" (it was only the second time that an artist dethroned himself in that country). The song remained in the top 10 for 21 weeks, 30 weeks in the top 50 and 36 weeks in the chart. Its best weekly sales were 103,564 on its 6th week. On December 1, 2005, it was certified Diamond disc 7 months after its release by SNEP, the French certifier. The song is the third best-selling single of the 21st century in France, with 1,270,000 units sold. (1,265,579 sales, according to another source).

Despite the Crazy Frog not being hugely well known in Japan, the single release also charted there, peaking at number 46. It peaked at number 50 in the U.S. Although "Axel F" managed to find more success in Mainstream Markets, it proved to be a moderate success on US Rhythmic Top 40 where it peaked at number 28 just scraping the top 30. It also peaked at number 3 on the U.S Digital Sales beating the likes of Lindsay Lohan and the Black Eyed Peas. Its highest U.S. success was just missing the top spot at number 2 on the US Adult Contemporary Top 20 however it became an Internet meme.

The song was the 65th best-selling single of the 2000s in the UK.

Music video
An overview of the city is shown. Then someone in a van with attached satellite dishes and high-tech instruments on the interior sees a message on one of the monitor, which reads "Wanted: The most annoying thing in the world", referring to Crazy Frog, with a bounty of $50000 specified for the catcher.

The bounty hunter activates a killbot mounted on armoured hover cycle in the video, then it proceeds to track the Crazy Frog as he commutes around the city on his imaginary motorcycle. As the bounty hunter closes in on his prey, Crazy Frog becomes aware of his pursuer and an unlikely chase begins over skyscrapers and through the city's sewer system, before the killbot launches a guided missile at the Frog.

However, Crazy Frog is able to mount the missile as it approaches him, evidently confusing its guidance system, as it then begins to loop and glide uncontrollably. The missile eventually locks onto the bounty hunter's van, destroying it and creating a large mushroom cloud. The mushroom cloud does not appear in the revised version of the video seen as of September 2021. Crazy Frog manages to escape the blast, covered in dust from the debris and appearing to deliver the closing 'lyrics'.

In 2011, the video was listed in NMEs "50 Worst Music Videos", ranking at 47. As of July 2022, it has been viewed more than 3.4 billion times on YouTube.

Track listing
 Australia "Axel F" (Radio Edit) – 2:54
 "Axel F" (Club Mix) – 6:23
 "Axel F" (Club Mix Instrumental) – 6:23
 "In the 80's" – 3:29

 UK'''
 "Axel F" (Radio Edit)
 "Axel F" (Bounce Mix)
 "Axel F" (Bounce Mix Instrumental)
 "Axel F" (Reservoir Frog Remix)
 "Axel F" (Original Version)
 "Axel F" (Video)

Charts and sales

Weekly charts

Year-end charts

Decade-end charts

Certifications and sales

Release history

See also
 Axel Foley
 Beverly Hills Cop (franchise)
 List of Hot Adult Contemporary number ones of 1985

References

External links
 The 8bitpeoples "Axel F" A freely downloadable compilation of various artists' interpretations of "Axel F" Released under Creative Commons license.
 Press release, including sound clips

1984 songs
1984 debut singles
1985 singles
1992 singles
1995 singles
2005 debut singles
1980s instrumentals
Beverly Hills Cop (franchise)
Captain Hollywood Project songs
Clock (dance act) songs
Crazy Frog songs
European Hot 100 Singles number-one singles
Irish Singles Chart number-one singles
MCA Records singles
Ministry of Sound singles
ZYX Music singles
Polydor Records singles
Number-one singles in Australia
Number-one singles in Denmark
SNEP Top Singles number-one singles
Number-one singles in New Zealand
Number-one singles in Norway
Number-one singles in Spain
Number-one singles in Sweden
Number-one singles in Switzerland
Ultratop 50 Singles (Flanders) number-one singles
Ultratop 50 Singles (Wallonia) number-one singles
UK Singles Chart number-one singles
Song recordings produced by Harold Faltermeyer
Songs written for films
Songs written by Harold Faltermeyer
Viral videos